Lisbon is a village in Claiborne Parish, Louisiana, United States. The population was 185 at the 2010 census. Lisbon is located east of the parish seat of Homer.

In the late 19th century Lisbon was the location of the former Lisbon Academy, attended for a brief time by T. H. Harris, state superintendent of education from 1908 to 1940. Lisbon was the birthplace of another Louisiana educator, John Sparks Patton, a member of the Louisiana Public Service Commission from 1939 to 1944 who twice lost races for state superintendent to T. H. Harris. He is  remembered as the first advocate of taxpayer-funded school textbooks.

Lisbon should not be confused with the village of Lisbon in Calcasieu Parish, Louisiana, which later evolved first into Bagdad and later into the city of Westlake.

Geography

Demographics

As of the census of 2000, there were 162 people, 69 households, and 48 families residing in the village. The population density was 12.3 inhabitants per square mile (4.8/km). There were 87 housing units at an average density of 6.6 per square mile (2.6/km). The racial makeup of the village was 65.43% White, 32.72% African American, 0.62% Pacific Islander, and 1.23% from two or more races.

There were 69 households, out of which 24.6% had children under the age of 18 living with them, 55.1% were married couples living together, 11.6% had a female householder with no husband present, and 30.4% were non-families. 26.1% of all households were made up of individuals, and 14.5% had someone living alone who was 65 years of age or older. The average household size was 2.35 and the average family size was 2.79.

In the village, the population was spread out, with 22.2% under the age of 18, 6.2% from 18 to 24, 24.1% from 25 to 44, 34.0% from 45 to 64, and 13.6% who were 65 years of age or older. The median age was 44 years. For every 100 females, there were 105.1 males. For every 100 females age 18 and over, there were 106.6 males.

The median income for a household in the village was $41,667, and the median income for a family was $50,417. Males had a median income of $36,250 versus $19,375 for females. The per capita income for the village was $18,943. About 3.6% of families and 6.0% of the population were below the poverty line, including 6.3% of those under the age of eighteen and 9.1% of those 65 or over.

Notable people
Willie Davis, professional football player
Edith Killgore Kirkpatrick, musician and music educator
Rebel Oakes, professional baseball player

References

Villages in Claiborne Parish, Louisiana
Villages in Louisiana